Reed Green Coliseum is an 8,095-seat multi-purpose arena in Hattiesburg, Mississippi, United States. Affectionately referred to by fans and local sportswriters as "The Yurt", it opened on December 6, 1965, and is home to the University of Southern Mississippi (USM) men's basketball team, women's basketball team and women's volleyball team. Prior to the Coliseum, USM's teams played at the USM Sports Arena, a 3,200-seat arena opened in 1949.

It is the Hattiesburg area's premier sports and entertainment venue. It is named for Reed Green, who attended the university and went on to serve as its coach and athletics director. Subsequent renovations over the years, which brought larger dressing rooms, officials' areas and a meeting room, for members of the Eagles Club, have kept Green Coliseum one of the area's main events venues with more renovations to follow.

It is also used for graduation ceremonies, civic events and concerts. As a concert venue, the Coliseum can seat nearly 9,100.

The arena played host to the final show of the Rolling Thunder Revue tour, headed by Bob Dylan, on May 1, 1976.

See also
 List of NCAA Division I basketball arenas

References

External links
 

Southern Miss Golden Eagles and Lady Eagles
College basketball venues in the United States
Indoor arenas in Mississippi
Basketball venues in Mississippi
Buildings and structures in Hattiesburg, Mississippi